Natalie Brown may refer to:

 Natalie Brown (singer) (born 1978), Canadian-born R&B and pop singer-songwriter
 Natalie Brown (actress) (born 1973), Canadian actress known for her role in Sophie
 Natalie E. Brown, American diplomat
 Natalie Browne, England-based vocalist project name owned by Almighty Records
 Natalie Brown (cricketer) (born 1990), English cricketer